Medical tourism in Pakistan is viewed as an untapped market that could be turned into a huge opportunity if the government "focuses on key issues". According to Pakistani medical experts, Pakistan has a "huge potential" in becoming a regional medical tourism hub, comparable to many other countries in its neighbourhood. Medical tourism in Pakistan has been arranging potential trips for many medical health and care procedures. A number of modern hospital facilities exist in major cities such as Islamabad, Karachi and Lahore that are fully equipped and facilitated with the latest medical technologies. Many doctors and surgeons in Pakistani hospitals tend to be foreign qualified. However, security issues and an overall below-par health infrastructure have challenged the growth of the industry.

Overview
The Government of Pakistan has mentioned its keenness on working towards medical tourism and has considered it as a key element in its recent tourism policy. In this regard, a task force was formed in 2010 under the Ministry of Tourism whose objectives were to explore proposals to "promote and develop medical, health, spiritual and wellness tourism in Pakistan". The Government of Punjab undertook a venture to develop a 150-bed hospital for kidney transplantation and heart surgery, two specialties that Pakistan seeks to attract medical tourists for.

Tourism officials have claimed that Pakistan can compete with other countries in medical tourism, and could even be "less than half the price of India".

The Minister for Tourism planned to introduce medical tourism in the country by providing "low cost state of the art medical facilities to the patients." According to the minister, a simple surgery could be "under a tenth of the cost of Europe or the US". He also said that Pakistan had highly qualified doctors to its benefit, as well as the latest medical equipment and hospitals with all necessary arrangements.

Treatments
A number of patients from neighbouring countries have traveled to Pakistan for treatment. Many patients, mainly of Pakistani origin, from the Middle East, United Kingdom and United States, also travel to Pakistan to seek a range of treatments which they cannot otherwise access in their resident countries either due to expense or lack of insurance coverage there; common treatments that these patients seek include cardiac surgery, infertility treatments, and cosmetic surgery.

Organ transplant
Pakistan’s initial entry into the medical tourism industry has been strongly reliant on cheap organ transplant tourism. In the past, a sizable number of global patients traveled to Pakistan for kidney transplants. However, these cases have dropped ever since legislation, that sought to outlaw the illegal trade of selling kidneys, was enacted. According to Pakistani medical experts, medical tourism is still an untapped market that could be turned into a huge opportunity if the government "focuses on key issues".

Fertility treatment
Pakistan has also been a lower-cost alternative for fertility tourism, particularly for treatments related to in-vitro fertilisation (IVF) and infertility. Many overseas Pakistanis choose to undergo IVF treatments in Pakistan due to the comparatively cheaper cost of treatment. According to one Pakistani doctor involved in IVF treatments, "IVF is way cheaper in Pakistan than other countries. You can get it done for one third the price that is in Dubai. The USA and UK are way too expensive. In 1998, there were barely three IVF centres in Pakistan and now the number has grown to over 15 centres." The average cost of IVF can reach up to $12,000 while in Pakistan, the cost of IVF can range from Rs. 200,000 (USD $1,950) to Rs. 450,000 (USD $4,390).

Source countries
Most medical patients who seek treatment in Pakistan are from neighbouring countries. According to Ministry of Foreign Affairs figures, some 90% of Afghans who seek medical treatment abroad travel to neighbouring Pakistan. The majority of Afghan patients are from the poorer strata of society who have access to free medical treatment in Pakistani government or  philanthropic healthcare facilities. Over forty percent of patients in Peshawar's largest government hospital were Afghans who had travelled from Afghanistan to Peshawar for medical treatment. Nearly one-third of all visas issued to Afghan nationals by the Pakistani embassy and consulates in Afghanistan pertain to medical reasons. In 2008, one philanthropic organisation in Pakistan performed over 30,000 free eye surgeries on Afghan patients.

Challenges
The continuing illegal organ transplant trade has hampered the image of the country's medical tourism industry. Kidney trade, mostly illegal, was once a thriving billion-dollar industry in Pakistan until the introduction of a law to prevent it. The illegal trade is still practiced however, with numerous cases being reported of foreign patients having traveled to Pakistan to get a kidney transplant. Secondly, while there is a large base of doctors present in the country, the overall health infrastructure of Pakistan is not as advanced or comparable to international standards. Only a certain number of modern and reputable hospitals exist. In addition, security-related issues have also prevented foreigners from travelling to Pakistan exclusively for seeking medical treatment.

Professor Tipu Sultan from Bahria University has argued that while the government has focused on improving hospital quality in the hope of attracting medical tourists, "terrorism in Pakistan is scaring away potential health customers." He adds that Pakistan could offer services to foreigners in orthopedic, optometric, ENT, heart, and urology treatments at cheap rates besides offering facilities in endoscopies, X-rays, MRI, CT scan, cardiology, and arthroscopy. Commenting on patients from the United States of Pakistani origin who come to Pakistan instead of going to neighboring India to receive treatment, Sultan has said that treatment in Pakistan for them tends to be much cheaper than in India "because of the downward slide of the rupee in terms of the dollar." He has also said that while there are good national hospitals, they have not shown enough interest in medical tourism.

See also
 Health care in Pakistan
 Tourism in Pakistan
 List of hospitals in Pakistan
 List of medical organizations in Pakistan

Related articles
 Medical tourism in India
 Medical tourism in Israel
 Medical tourism in Thailand

References

External links
 Medical Tourism at Pakistan Tourism Development Corporation

Pakistan Medical Tourism Profile at International Medical Travel Journal IMTJ

Pakistan Medical Association
 The outcome of commercial kidney transplant tourism in Pakistan. (Ivanovski N; Masin J; Rambabova-Busljetic I; Pusevski V; Dohcev S; Ivanovski O; Popov Z.), National Center for Biotechnology Information

Pakistan
Healthcare in Pakistan
Tourism in Pakistan